The 1st AIBA American 2004 Olympic Boxing Qualifying Tournament was held in Tijuana, Mexico from March 12 to March 20, 2004. It was the first chance for amateur boxers from North-, Central- and South America to qualify for the 2004 Summer Olympics after the 2003 Pan American Games in Santo Domingo, Dominican Republic. The top two boxers in each weight division gained a place in the Olympics, with the exception of the heavyweight and super heavyweight divisions in which just the winner was entered.

Medal winners

Qualified

Light Flyweight (– 48 kg)

Flyweight (– 51 kg)

Bantamweight (– 54 kg)

Featherweight (– 57 kg)

Lightweight (– 60 kg)

Light Welterweight (– 64 kg)

Welterweight (– 69 kg)

Middleweight (– 75 kg)

Light Heavyweight (– 81 kg)

Heavyweight (– 91 kg)

Super Heavyweight (+ 91 kg)

See also
Boxing at the 2003 Pan American Games
2nd AIBA American 2004 Olympic Qualifying Tournament

External links
amateur-boxing

American 1
2004 in Mexican sports
Sports in Tijuana
21st century in Tijuana
Sports competitions in Baja California